Wael el-Ebrashy (26 October 1963 – 9 January 2022) was an Egyptian journalist and television presenter.

Life and career 
Born in Sherbin, el-Ebrashy started his career as a journalist in the magazine Rose al-Yūsuf, and later worked as editor-in-chief of the newspaper , from which he resigned in 2010.

He started his career as a television talk show host for the private TV stations Dream TV and  ON TV, and later landed in the state television Channel 1, where he presented the popular talk show Al-Tesea ("“9 o'clock").

In December 2020, el-Ebrashy contracted COVID-19, which caused severe damage to his lungs; he was discharged from the hospital three months later but never fully recovered. el-Ebrashy died on 9 January 2022, at the age of 58.

References

1963 births
2022 deaths 
Deaths from the COVID-19 pandemic in Egypt
Egyptian journalists
Egyptian television presenters
People from Dakahlia Governorate